Shahlo Nasimovna Mahmudova is an Uzbekistani politician. She was the first Minister of Foreign Affairs of the country after independence, serving from 1991 until 1992.

Mahmudova received her education at the Taskhent Textile Institute, and began her political career with the Komsomol in the Soviet era. Eventually she rose to become secretary of the Young Communist League of the Uzbek SSR. Soon after independence, President Islam Karimov named her Minister of Foreign Affairs, at the same time decreeing that Zokir Almatov should become Minister of Internal Affairs. It was rumored that her appointment was due to the influence of Shukrullo Mirsaidov. She did not last long in the position; events during her ministry included the entry of Uzbekistan into the United Nations and a state visit by the President of Turkey. She also met with representatives of the government of the United States during her tenure. Otherwise she did not play a major role in the diplomatic life of her country, and during her time at the ministry she kept a relatively low political profile. Later in her career she became Head of the Department for Attracting Foreign Investments and International Cooperation at the Center for Special Secondary Vocational Education, and also worked at the Ministry of Foreign Affairs.

References

Living people
Year of birth missing (living people)
Place of birth missing (living people)
Foreign Ministers of Uzbekistan
Women government ministers of Uzbekistan
20th-century Uzbekistani women politicians
20th-century Uzbekistani politicians
Uzbekistani women diplomats
Female foreign ministers